The Colors X-Factors is a cricket team that represents in the Nepal Premier League. Gyanendra Malla, vice captain of Nepal national cricket team, is the captain of the team, whereas Manzoor Alam is the head coach. The team is owned by Teletalk Private Limited.

References 

Cricket teams in Nepal
Everest Premier League
Cricket clubs established in 2014
2014 establishments in Nepal